Little Dorrit is a 2008 British miniseries based on Charles Dickens's serial novel of the same title, originally published between 1855 and 1857. The screenplay is by Andrew Davies and the episodes were directed by Adam Smith, Dearbhla Walsh, and Diarmuid Lawrence.

The series was a joint production of the BBC and the American PBS member station WGBH Boston. It originally was broadcast by BBC One and BBC HD, beginning on 26 October 2008 with a 60-minute opening episode, followed by 12 half-hour episodes and a 60-minute finale. In the United States, it aired in five episodes as part of PBS's Masterpiece series between 29 March and 26 April 2009. In Australia, episodes were combined into seven-parts on ABC1 each Sunday at 8:30pm from 27 June 2010 and has since been repeated on UKTV.

The series won seven Primetime Emmy Awards, including Outstanding Miniseries.

Plot
Since her birth in 1805, twenty-one years prior, Amy Dorrit has lived in the Marshalsea Prison for Debt, caring for her father, William, who now enjoys a position of privileged seniority as the Father of the Marshalsea. Amy works as a seamstress for Mrs. Clennam, a cranky, cold and forbidding semi-invalid living in a crumbling home with servants, the sinister Jeremiah Flintwinch and his bumbling wife, Affery.

Mr. Clennam is ill in China with his son, Arthur. His dying wish is that his son "put it right" with his mother. He gives Arthur a pocket watch for her, with hidden meaning. Returning to England after 15 years, Arthur gives his mother the watch, which she opens and reads "Do not forget." Arthur is enamoured of the beautiful Minnie (Pet) Meagles, who prefers aspiring artist, Henry Gowan, to her parents' distress. Arthur befriends Amy, but only as someone helping his mother. Amy falls in love with him. John Chivery, who guards the prison with his father, watches, dismayed, because he loves Amy.

Amy's brother, Tip, falls into debt and joins his father in prison. Arthur pays his debt anonymously, but Amy guesses; whilst Tip is ungrateful,  Amy's love for Arthur grows. Arthur, observing his mother's uncharacteristically benevolent attitude towards Amy, suspects his family may be responsible for the Dorrits' misfortunes and asks rent collector and amateur detective, Mr. Pancks, to investigate.

Chivery proposes to Amy, who declines, upsetting both fathers and threatening Dorrit's position. Arthur, unaware of Amy's love, proposes to Pet, who tells him she plans to marry Gowan. He meets inventor-engineer Daniel Doyce: they become partners.

An ex-convict, Rigaud, meets Flintwinch's brother, Ephraim, who has Mrs. Clennam's papers, which she had ordered Jeremiah to burn. Rigaud gets Ephraim drunk, murders him, and takes the papers, learning the Clennam family secret.

Pancks discovers that Dorrit is heir to a fortune. Dorrit, now wealthy, leaves the Marshalsea and insists his family forget their "shameful past" and everyone connected to it, snubbing and insulting Arthur. He hires Mrs Hortensia General to educate his daughters and prepare them for society. They all depart on a Grand Tour of Europe, but Amy cannot adapt to the new lifestyle.  Amy's sister, Fanny, is courted by, and accepts, the step-son of wealthy banker, Mr. Merdle. At Pancks' suggestion, Arthur invests in Merdle's bank.

Dorrit returns to England and asks Merdle for advice on "prudent investment". Merdle agrees to invest Dorrit's fortune as a family favour. Dorrit , still tormented by prison memories, returns to Italy to propose to Mrs General, but loses his sanity and dies. Amy returns to London, where she is accommodated by the newly-married Fanny.

Merdle kills himself, his suicide note revealing that his bank is a Ponzi scheme which has ruined thousands, including Arthur, who is forced into the Marshalsea. Chivery angrily reveals to Arthur that Amy loves him. Arthur becomes feverish and is nursed by Amy, who offers to pay his debts, but he refuses.

Rigaud returns to Mrs. Clennam and reveals what he learned from the documents: her unloving attitude drove her husband to infidelity, which resulted in a son, Arthur, whom Mrs. Clennam raised as her own, without any motherly feeling. When Arthur's birth mother died, his paternal grandfather bequeathed money to Amy, who was born in the Marshalsea the day Arthur's birth mother died there. Rigaud demands £2,000 to keep silent, but Mrs. Clennam leaves her house for the first time in years, finds Amy, reveals the truth, and begs forgiveness. Her dilapidated house collapses, killing Rigaud. Returning to her demolished home, Mrs. Clennam collapses and dies.

The Dorrits learn that their money had been invested with Merdle, and is lost. Now that Amy is penniless, Arthur accepts her, and they declare their mutual love. Daniel Doyce returns from Russia, where he has made a fortune, which he shares with Arthur, who marries her.

Cast

Production
The series was filmed on location at Chenies Manor House, Luton Hoo, and Hellfire Caves in Buckinghamshire; Deal Castle in Kent; Hampton Court Palace in Surrey as the Marshalsea; and the Old Royal Naval College in Greenwich. Interiors were filmed in the Pinewood Studios.

Critical reception
On Rotten Tomatoes, 100% of 10 critics have given the series a positive review, and the consensus states, "With a sterling cast and plenty of juicy drama, Little Dorrit is a superb adaptation."

United Kingdom
In the United Kingdom, the series was often compared to Davies' Bleak House, which was released three years earlier. One reviewer for The Daily Telegraph wrote that "Some of the acting has been a bit too hammy" and blamed falling viewing figures on "confusion over scheduling, starting as an hour long special and then breaking into half an hour episodes, like a Victorian East Enders"; another added that it "doesn't seem to have caught on in the same way as other recent costume dramas such as Cranford and Bleak House", both due to scheduling and also down since "it wasn't quite as good" as these two programmes, though also that "Most of the cast were as reliably terrific". The Independent also praised the performances, especially Courtney, Macfadyen and Peake, whilst another of its reviewers praised Davies' adaptation. The Guardian also praised the acting and the adaptation, though with the caveat that "because it's Dickens, those top names can get away with a little bit more showing off and look-at-me acting than they would be able to in, say, Jane Austen".

United States
Brian Lowry of Variety observed, "Slow going at first and rushed near the end, it's nevertheless an absorbing piece of work, reminding us that there are certain things the Brits simply do better... Davies could have easily shed (or at least pared down) a few of [the] subplots without seriously diminishing the story's grandeur, and after the lengthy windup, the last hour races through tying up the assorted loose ends. Even so, there's so much gaudy talent on display here that those with an appetite for it won't be able to get enough, and Little Dorrit gives them everything they could want in a big, gloriously messy package."

Matthew Gilbert of The Boston Globe felt the series "has so many virtues – indelible performances, stirring pathos, and an emotional and psychological heft unusual for Dickens – that you can forgive its one significant flaw... For all its feeling, Little Dorrit does not wrap up well, which is a no-no when it comes to Dickens. Indeed, a Dickens denouement needs to be neat... But the loose strings that Davies leaves dangling at the end of this script are frustrating. All the carefully built mystery implodes in the final act, as the importance of a number of characters... and the backstory itself are left murky in ways that Dickens made clear... It's hard to imagine how this happened in the course of such an otherwise mindful endeavor. And yet Little Dorrit is still rewarding, for the long journey, if not for the final stop."

Robert Lloyd of the Los Angeles Times noted, "Not every character is exactly as described on paper; some don't stay around long enough to register and others who have earned our interest just disappear. And the story can be confusing at times. But all in all, this is a dynamic, addictive rendition of a complicated novel."

Jonathan Storm of The Philadelphia Inquirer stated, "Andrew Davies, who made 2006's Bleak House one of the best TV shows of the year, crafts another superb script, with characters and incidents squeezing out the sides, just the thing to satisfy close observers, which anyone joining this maxi mini-series should be. Costumes, sets, and actors, a broad lot of those super-skilled, terrifically trained Brits, make for sumptuous viewing... You pretty much know what to expect when Masterpiece visits the 19th century. But Little Dorrit stands at the high end of a very lofty list of period-piece achievement. It's big entertainment."

In her review in The New York Times, Alessandra Stanley said the series "is as rich at the margins as at the center with strange, and strangely believable, characters from almost all levels of society, rendered in quick, firm strokes," while David Wiegand of the San Francisco Chronicle called it "terrific entertainment... in some ways, perhaps even better than its source material."

Awards and nominations

See also
Television in the United Kingdom
2008 in television

Notes

References

External links
 BBC Press Pack
 Cast and crew interviews
 Behind the scenes videos
 
 
 

2008 British television series debuts
2008 British television series endings
2000s British drama television series
BBC high definition shows
BBC television dramas
2000s British television miniseries
Films based on Little Dorrit
Period television series
Television shows based on works by Charles Dickens
Television shows written by Andrew Davies
Primetime Emmy Award for Outstanding Miniseries winners
Primetime Emmy Award-winning television series
Television series set in the 1830s